Ahmad Mahomed Amla (born 15 September 1979) is a South African former cricketer.

He played domestic cricket for the Dolphins. A right-handed batsman, he made his first-class debut as a teenager in 1997/98. His brother, Hashim Amla, played  Test and ODI cricket for South Africa.

In April 2013, it was announced that Amla was retiring from all forms of cricket. He planned to focus on his studies towards a business degree and to pursue business interests.

Playing career 

Amla made his first-class debut in 1997 for Natal B. He was picked in the South Africa Academy that toured Namibia and was also selected for the South African under-19 team. He established himself as a regular in the Kwa-Zulu Natal provincial team and when franchise cricket took off, he played for the Dolphins - with his brother for a time, and captained the side from 2006 to 2009, becoming the second Amla to do so after Hashim captained the side in 2004.

Coaching career 

From at least 2011 to 2013, Amla was involved in coaching roles with the Mozambican national team, initially as a consultant and then as senior coach.

References

External links
 

1979 births
Living people
Dolphins cricketers
KwaZulu-Natal cricketers
South African cricketers
South African people of Indian descent
South African people of Gujarati descent
Cricketers from Durban
South African Muslims
South African cricket coaches
Cricket in Mozambique
South African expatriates in Mozambique

People from eThekwini Metropolitan Municipality